Palapye Primary Hospital is a government-run district hospital located in Palapye, Botswana.

References

External links 
 Botswana Ministry of Health

Hospitals in Botswana